Unreal Engine (UE) is a 3D computer graphics game engine developed by Epic Games, first showcased in the 1998 first-person shooter game Unreal. Initially developed for PC first-person shooters, it has since been used in a variety of genres of games and has seen adoption by other industries, most notably the film and television industry. Unreal Engine is written in C++ and features a high degree of portability, supporting a wide range of desktop, mobile, console, and virtual reality platforms.

The latest generation, Unreal Engine 5, was launched in April 2022. Its source code is available on GitHub, and commercial use is granted based on a royalty model. Epic waives their royalties margin for games until developers have earned  in revenue and the fee is waived if developers publish on the Epic Games Store. Epic has included features from acquired companies like Quixel in the engine, which is seen as helped by Fortnite's revenue.

History

First generation

The first-generation Unreal Engine was developed by Tim Sweeney, the founder of Epic Games. Having created editing tools for his shareware games ZZT (1991) and Jill of the Jungle (1992), Sweeney began writing the engine in 1995 for the production of a game that would later become a first-person shooter known as Unreal. After years in development, it debuted with the game's release in 1998, although MicroProse and Legend Entertainment had access to the technology much earlier, licensing it in 1996. According to an interview, Sweeney wrote 90 percent of the code in the engine, including the graphics, tools, and networking.

At first, the engine relied completely on software rendering, meaning the graphics calculations were handled by the central processing unit (CPU). However, over time, it was able to take advantage of the capabilities provided by dedicated graphics cards, focusing on the Glide API, specially designed for 3dfx accelerators. While OpenGL and Direct3D were supported, they reported a slower performance compared to Glide due to their deficiency in texture management at the time. Sweeney particularly criticized the quality of OpenGL drivers for consumer hardware, describing them as "extremely problematic, buggy, and untested", and labeled the code in the implementation as "scary" as opposed to the simpler and cleaner support for Direct3D. With regard to audio, Epic employed the Galaxy Sound System, a software created in assembly language that integrated both EAX and Aureal technologies, and allowed the use of tracker music, which gave level designers flexibility in how a game soundtrack was played at a specific point in maps. Steve Polge, the author of the Reaper Bots plugin for Quake, programmed the artificial intelligence system, based on knowledge he had gained at his previous employer IBM designing router protocols. 

According to Sweeney, the hardest part of the engine to program was the renderer, as he had to rewrite its core algorithm several times during development, though he found less "glamorous" the infrastructure connecting all the subsystems. Despite requiring a significant personal effort, he said the engine was his favorite project at Epic, adding: "Writing the first Unreal Engine was a 3.5-year, breadth-first tour of hundreds of unique topics in software and was incredibly enlightening." Among its features were collision detection, colored lighting, and a limited form of texture filtering. It also integrated a level editor, UnrealEd, that had support for real-time constructive solid geometry operations as early as 1996, allowing mappers to change the level layout on the fly. Even though Unreal was designed to compete with id Software (developer of Doom and Quake), co-founder John Carmack complimented the game for the use of 16-bit color and remarked its implementation of visual effects such as volumetric fog. "I doubt any important game will be designed with 8-bit color in mind from now on. Unreal has done an important thing in pushing toward direct color, and this gives the artists a lot more freedom," he said in an article written by Geoff Keighley for GameSpot. "Light blooms [the spheres of light], fog volumes, and composite skies were steps I was planning on taking, but Epic got there first with Unreal," he said, adding: "The Unreal engine has raised the bar on what action gamers expect from future products. The visual effects first seen in the game will become expected from future games."

Unreal was noted for its graphical innovations, but Sweeney acknowledged in a 1999 interview with Eurogamer that many aspects of the game were unpolished, citing complaints from gamers about its high system requirements and online gameplay issues. Epic addressed these points during the development of Unreal Tournament by incorporating several enhancements in the engine intended to optimize performance on low-end machines and improve the networking code, while also refining the artificial intelligence for bots to display coordination in team-based gamemodes such as Capture the Flag. Originally planned as an expansion pack for Unreal, the game also came with increased image quality with the support for the S3TC compression algorithm, allowing for 24-bit high resolution textures without compromising performance. In addition to being available on Windows, Linux, Mac and Unix, the engine was ported through Unreal Tournament to the PlayStation 2 and, with the help of Secret Level, to the Dreamcast.

By late 1999, The New York Times indicated that there had been sixteen external projects using Epic's technology, including Deus Ex, The Wheel of Time, and Duke Nukem Forever, the latter of which was originally based on the Quake II engine. Unlike id Software, whose engine business only offered the source code, Epic provided support for licensees and would get together with their leads to discuss improvements to its game development system, internally dubbed the Unreal Tech Advisory Group. While it cost around $3 million to produce and licenses for up to $350,000, Epic gave players the ability to modify its games with the incorporation of UnrealEd and a scripting language called UnrealScript, sparking a community of enthusiasts around a game engine built to be extensible over multiple generations of games.

Unreal Engine 2 

In October 1998, IGN reported, based on an interview with affiliate Voodoo Extreme, that Sweeney was doing research for his next-generation engine. With development starting a year later, the second version made its debut in 2002 with America's Army, a free multiplayer shooter developed by the U.S. Army as a recruitment device. Soon after, Epic would release Unreal Championship on the Xbox, one of the first games to utilize Microsoft's Xbox Live.

Though based on its predecessor, this generation saw a notable advance in rendering terms as well as new improvements to the tool set. Capable of running levels nearly 100 times more detailed than those found in Unreal, the engine integrated a variety of features, including a cinematic editing tool, particle systems, export plug-ins for 3D Studio Max and Maya, and a skeletal animation system first showcased in the PlayStation 2 version of Unreal Tournament. In addition, the user interface for UnrealEd was rewritten in C++ using the wxWidgets toolkit, which Sweeney said was the "best thing available" at the time.

Epic used the Karma physics engine, a third-party software from UK-based studio Math Engine, to drive the physical simulations such as ragdoll player collisions and arbitrary rigid body dynamics. With Unreal Tournament 2004, vehicle-based gameplay was successfully implemented, enabling large-scale combat. While Unreal Tournament 2003 had support for vehicle physics through the Karma engine, as demonstrated by a testmap with a "hastily-constructed vehicle", it wasn't until Psyonix created a modification out of Epic's base code that the game received fully coded vehicles. Impressed by their efforts, Epic decided to include it in its successor as a new game mode under the name Onslaught by hiring Psyonix as a contractor. Psyonix would later develop Rocket League before being acquired by Epic in 2019.

A specialized version of UE2 called UE2X was designed for Unreal Championship 2: The Liandri Conflict on the original Xbox platform, featuring optimizations specific to that console. In March 2011, Ubisoft Montreal revealed that UE2 was successfully running on the Nintendo 3DS via Tom Clancy's Splinter Cell 3D. "The 3DS is powerful, and we are able to run the Unreal Engine on this console, which is pretty impressive for a handheld machine, and the 3D doesn't affect the performance (thanks to my amazing programmers)," said Ubisoft.

Unreal Engine 3
Screenshots of Unreal Engine 3 were presented by July 2004, at which point the engine had already been in development for over 18 months. The engine was based on the first-generation but contained new features. "The basic architectural decisions visible to programmers of an object-oriented design, a data-driven scripting approach, and a fairly modular approach to subsystems still remain [from Unreal Engine 1]. But the parts of the game that are really visible to gamers –the renderer, the physics system, the sound system, and the tools– are all visibly new and dramatically more powerful," said Sweeney. Unlike Unreal Engine 2, which still supported a fixed-function pipeline, Unreal Engine 3 was designed to take advantage of fully programmable shader hardware. All lighting and shadowing calculations were done per pixel, instead of per vertex. On the rendering side, Unreal Engine 3 provided support for a gamma-correct high-dynamic range renderer. The first games released using Unreal Engine 3 were Gears of War for Xbox 360, and RoboBlitz for Windows, which were both released on November 7, 2006.

Initially, Unreal Engine 3 only supported Windows, PlayStation 3, and Xbox 360 platforms, while iOS (first demonstrated with Epic Citadel) and Android were added later in 2010, with Infinity Blade being the first iOS title and Dungeon Defenders the first Android title. In 2011, it was announced that the engine would support Adobe Flash Player 11 through the Stage 3D hardware-accelerated APIs and that it was being used in two Wii U games, Batman: Arkham City and Aliens: Colonial Marines. In 2013, Epic teamed-up with Mozilla to bring Unreal Engine 3 to the web; using the asm.js sublanguage and Emscripten compiler, they were able to port the engine in four days.

Throughout the lifetime of UE3, significant updates were incorporated, including improved destructible environments, soft body dynamics, large crowd simulation, iOS functionality, Steamworks integration, a real-time global illumination solution, and stereoscopic 3D on Xbox 360 via TriOviz for Games Technology. DirectX 11 support was demonstrated with the Samaritan demo, which was unveiled at the 2011 Game Developers Conference and built by Epic Games in a close partnership with Nvidia, with engineers working around the country to push real-time graphics to a new high point.

Unreal Development Kit
While Unreal Engine 3 was quite open for modders to work with, the ability to publish and sell games meant using UE3 was restricted to licenses of the engine. However, in November 2009, Epic released a free version of UE3's SDK, called the Unreal Development Kit (UDK), that is available to the general public.

In December 2010, the kit was updated to include support for creating iOS games and apps. OS X compatibility followed in the September 2011 release.

Unreal Engine 4

In August 2005, Mark Rein, the vice-president of Epic Games, revealed that Unreal Engine 4 had been in development for two years. "People don't realise this but we're already two years into development of Unreal Engine 4. It certainly doesn't have a full team yet, it's just one guy and you can probably guess who that guy is," he told C&VG. Speaking in an interview in early 2008, Sweeney stated that he was basically the only person working on the engine, though he affirmed his research and development department would start to expand later that year, designing the engine in parallel with the development of Unreal Engine 3. "In some way, we resemble a hardware company with our generational development of technology. We are going to have a team developing Unreal Engine 3 for years to come and a team ramping up on Unreal Engine 4. And then, as the next-gen transition begins, we will be moving everybody to that. We actually are doing parallel development for multiple generations concurrently," he said.

In February 2012, Rein stated "people are going to be shocked later this year when they see Unreal Engine 4"; Epic unveiled UE4 to limited attendees at the 2012 Game Developers Conference, and a video of the engine being demonstrated by technical artist Alan Willard was released to the public on June 7, 2012, via GameTrailers TV. One of the major features planned for UE4 was real-time global illumination using voxel cone tracing, eliminating pre-computed lighting. However, this feature, called Sparse Voxel Octree Global Illumination (SVOGI) and showcased with the Elemental demo, was replaced with a similar but less computationally expensive algorithm due to performance concerns. UE4 also includes the new "Blueprints" visual scripting system (a successor to UE3's "Kismet"), which allows for rapid development of game logic without using code, resulting in less of a divide between technical artists, designers, and programmers.

On March 19, 2014, at the Game Developers Conference (GDC), Epic Games released Unreal Engine 4 through a new licensing model. Any released product was charged with a 5% royalty of gross revenues. The first game released using Unreal Engine 4 was Daylight, developed with early access to the engine and released on April 29, 2014.

On September 4, 2014, Epic released Unreal Engine 4 to schools and universities for free, including personal copies for students enrolled in accredited video game development, computer science, art, architecture, simulation, and visualization programs. Epic opened an Unreal Engine Marketplace for acquiring game assets. On February 19, 2015, Epic launched Unreal Dev Grants, a $5 million development fund aiming to provide grants to creative projects using Unreal Engine 4.

In March 2015, Epic released Unreal Engine 4, along with all future updates, for free for all users. In exchange, Epic established a selective royalty schedule, asking for 5% of revenue for products that make more than $3,000 per quarter. Sweeney stated that when they moved to the subscription model in 2014, use of Unreal grew by 10 times and through many smaller developers, and believed that they would draw even more uses through this new pricing scheme.

In an attempt to attract Unreal Engine developers, Oculus VR announced in October 2016 that it will pay royalty fees for all Unreal-powered Oculus Rift titles published on their store for up to the first $5 million of gross revenue per game.

To prepare for the release of its free-to-play battle royale mode in Fortnite in September 2017, Epic had to make a number of Unreal Engine modifications that helped it to handle a large number (up to 100) of connections to the same server while still retaining high bandwidth and to improve the rendering of a large open in-game world. Epic said it would incorporate these changes into future updates of the Unreal Engine.

With the opening of the Epic Games Store in December 2018, Epic will not charge the 5% revenue fee on games that use the Unreal Engine and are released through the Epic Games Stores, absorbing that cost as part of the base 12% cut Epic is taking to cover other costs.

Effective May 13, 2020, and retroactive to January 1, 2020, the royalty exemption amount is increased to US$1,000,000 in lifetime gross revenue per title.

Supported platforms 
Unreal Engine 4 officially supports the following platforms as of 4.27 (August 2021):

 Windows, macOS, Linux,
 iOS, Android 
 Nintendo Switch, PlayStation 4, Xbox One, PlayStation 5, Xbox Series X/S, and Stadia.
 Magic Leap, HTC Vive, Oculus, PlayStation VR, OSVR, Samsung Gear VR, and HoloLens 2.

It formerly officially supported Google Daydream and HTML5.

Unreal Engine 5

Unreal Engine 5 was revealed on May 13, 2020, supporting all existing systems including the next-generation consoles PlayStation 5 and Xbox Series X/S. Work on the engine started about two years prior to its announcement. It was released in early access on May 26, 2021, and formally launched for developers on April 5, 2022. 

One of its major features is Nanite, an engine that allows for high-detailed photographic source material to be imported into games. The Nanite virtualized geometry technology allows Epic to take advantage of its past acquisition of Quixel, the world's largest photogrammetry library as of 2019. The goal of Unreal Engine 5 was to make it as easy as possible for developers to create detailed game worlds without having to spend excessive time on creating new detailed assets. Nanite can import nearly any other pre-existing three-dimension representation of objects and environments, including ZBrush and CAD models, enabling the use of film-quality assets. Nanite automatically handles the levels of detail (LODs) of these imported objects appropriate to the target platform and draw distance, a task that an artist would have had to perform otherwise. Lumen is another component described as a "fully dynamic global illumination solution that immediately reacts to scene and light changes". Lumen eliminates the need for artists and developers to craft a lightmap for a given scene, but instead calculates light reflections and shadows on the fly, thus allowing for real-time behavior of light sources. Virtual Shadow Maps is another component added in Unreal Engine 5 described as "a new shadow mapping method used to deliver consistent, high-resolution shadowing that works with film-quality assets and large, dynamically lit open worlds". Virtual Shadow Maps differs from the common shadow map implementation in its extremely high resolution, more detailed shadows, and the lack of shadows popping in and out which can be found in the more common shadow maps technique due to shadow cascades. Additional components include Niagara for fluid and particle dynamics and Chaos for a physics engine.
 
With potentially tens of billions of polygons present on a single screen at 4K resolution, Epic also developed the Unreal Engine 5 to take advantage of the upcoming high-speed storage solutions with the next-generation console hardware that will use a mix of RAM and custom solid-state drives. Epic had worked closely with Sony in optimizing Unreal Engine 5 for the PlayStation 5, with Epic collaborating with Sony on the console's storage architecture. To demonstrate the ease of creating a detailed world with minimal effort, the May 2020 reveal of the engine showcased a demo called "Lumen in the Land of Nanite" running on a PlayStation 5 that was built mostly by pulling assets from the Quixel library and using the Nanite, Lumen, and other Unreal Engine 5 components to create a photorealistic cave setting that could be explored. Epic affirmed that Unreal Engine 5 would be fully supported on the Xbox Series X as well, but had been focused on the PlayStation 5 during the announcement as a result of their work with Sony in the years prior. Epic plans to use Fortnite as a testbed for Unreal Engine 5 to showcase what the engine can do to the industry, with the game brought to use Unreal Engine 5 in December 2021. Fortnite'''s Battle Royale mode received visual improvements via Unreal Engine 5.1 with the launch of Chapter 4 on December 4th, 2022. Ninja Theory's Senua's Saga: Hellblade II will also be one of the first games to use Unreal Engine 5. The Matrix Awakens, a tie-in experience ahead of the release of The Matrix Resurrections, was developed by Epic to be a further demonstration of Unreal Engine 5 along with other technology that they had acquired over 2020 and 2021, including their MetaHuman Creator developed and integrated into Unreal Engine 5 with technology from 3Lateral, Cubic Motion, and Quixel.

Additional features planned for Unreal Engine 5 come from Epic's acquisitions and partnerships. The MetaHuman Creator is a project based on technology from three companies acquired by Epic—3Lateral, Cubic Motion, and Quixel—to allow developers to quickly create realistic human characters that can then be exported for use within Unreal. Through partnership with Cesium, Epic plans to offer a free plugin to provide 3D geospatial data for Unreal users, allowing them to recreate any part of the mapped surface of Earth. Epic will include RealityCapture, a product it acquired with its acquisition of Capturing Reality that can generate 3D models of any object from a collection of photographs taken of it from multiple angles, and the various middleware tools offered by Epic Game Tools.

Unreal Engine 5 will retain the current royalty model, with developers returning 5% of gross revenues to Epic Games, though this fee is waived for those that release their games on the Epic Games Store. Further, Epic announced alongside Unreal Engine 5 that they will not take any fee from games using any version of Unreal Engine for the first  in gross revenue, retroactive to January 1, 2020.

 Scripting 
UnrealScript

UnrealScript (often abbreviated to UScript) was Unreal Engine's native scripting language used for authoring game code and gameplay events before the release of Unreal Engine 4. The language was designed for simple, high-level game programming. UnrealScript was programmed by Sweeney, who also created an earlier game scripting language, ZZT-OOP. Deus Ex lead programmer Chris Norden described it as "super flexible" but noted its low execution speed.

Similar to Java, UnrealScript was object-oriented without multiple inheritance (classes all inherit from a common Object class), and classes were defined in individual files named for the class they define. Unlike Java, UnrealScript did not have object wrappers for primitive types. Interfaces were only supported in Unreal Engine generation 3 and a few Unreal Engine 2 games. UnrealScript supported operator overloading, but not method overloading, except for optional parameters.

At the 2012 Game Developers Conference, Epic announced that UnrealScript was being removed from Unreal Engine 4 in favor of C++. Visual scripting would be supported by the Blueprints Visual Scripting system, a replacement for the earlier Kismet visual scripting system.

Verse
Verse is the new scripting language for Unreal Engine, expected to be first implemented in Fortnite. Simon Peyton Jones, known for his contributions to the Haskell programming language, joined Epic Games in December 2021 as Engineering Fellow to work on Verse with his long-time colleague Lennart Augustsson and others.

Presented by Peyton at Haskell eXchange 2022, Verse is planned to be released sometime in 2023 as an open language for the metaverse.

 Marketplace 
With Unreal Engine 4, Epic opened the Unreal Engine Marketplace in September 2014. The Marketplace is a digital storefront that allows content creators and developers to provide art assets, models, sounds, environments, code snippets, and other features that others could purchase, along with tutorials and other guides. Some content is provided for free by Epic, including previously offered Unreal assets and tutorials. Prior to July 2018, Epic took a 30% share of the sales but due to the success of Unreal and Fortnite Battle Royale, Epic retroactively reduced its take to 12%.

Usage
Video games
The Unreal Engine was originally designed to be used as the underlying technology for video games. The engine is used in a number of high-profile game titles with high graphics capabilities, including PlayerUnknown's Battlegrounds, Final Fantasy VII Remake, Valorant and Yoshi’s Crafted World, in addition to games developed by Epic, including Gears of War and Fortnite.

Film and television
The Unreal Engine has found use in film making to create virtual sets that can track with a camera's motion around actors and objects and be rendered in real time to large LED screens and atmospheric lighting systems. This allows for real-time composition of shots, immediate editing of the virtual sets as needed, and the ability to shoot multiple scenes within a short period by just changing the virtual world behind the actors. The overall appearance was recognized to appear more natural than typical chromakey effects.

Among the productions to use these technologies were the television series The Mandalorian and Westworld. Jon Favreau and Lucasfilm's Industrial Light & Magic division worked with Epic in developing their StageCraft technology for The Mandalorian, based on a similar approach Favreau had used in The Lion King. Favreau then shared this technology approach with Jonathan Nolan and Lisa Joy, the producers for Westworld. The show had already looked at the use of virtual sets before and had some technology established, but integrated the use of Unreal Engine as with StageCraft for its third season.

Orca Studios, a Spanish-based company, has been working with Epic to establish multiple studios for virtual filming similar to the StageCraft approach with  Unreal Engine providing the virtual sets, particularly during the COVID-19 pandemic, which restricted travel.

In January 2021, Deadline Hollywood announced that Epic was using part of its Epic MegaGrants to back for the first time an animated feature film, Gilgamesh, to be produced fully in Unreal Engine by animation studios Hook Up, DuermeVela and FilmSharks. As part of an extension of its MegaGrants, Epic also funded 45 additional projects since around 2020 for making movies and short films in the Unreal Engine. By October 2022, Epic was working with several different groups at over 300 virtual sets across the world.

Other uses
Unreal Engine has also been used by non-creative fields due to its availability and feature sets. It has been used as a basis for a virtual reality tool to explore pharmaceutical drug molecules in collaboration with other researchers, as a virtual environment to explore and design new buildings and automobiles, and used for cable news networks to support real-time graphics.

In March 2012, Epic Games announced a partnership with Virtual Heroes of Applied Research Associates to launch Unreal Government Network, a program that handles Unreal Engine licenses for government agencies. Several projects originated with this support agreement, including an anaesthesiology training software for U.S. Army physicians, a multiplayer crime scene simulation developed by the FBI Academy, and various applications for the Intelligence Advanced Research Projects Activity with the aim to help intelligence analysts recognize and mitigate cognitive biases that might affect their work. Similarly, the DHS Science and Technology Directorate and the U.S. Army's Training and Doctrine Command and Research Laboratory employed the engine to develop a platform to train first responders titled Enhanced Dynamic Geo-Social Environment (EDGE).

 Awards 
The engine has received numerous awards:

Technology & Engineering Emmy Award from the National Academy of Television Arts and Sciences (NATAS) for "3D Engine Software for the Production of Animation" in 2018
Primetime Engineering Emmy Award from the Television Academy for exceptional developments in broadcast technology in 2020
Annie Award from ASIFA-Hollywood for technical advancement in animation in 2021
 Game Developer Magazine Front Line Award for Best Game Engine for 2004, 2005, 2006, 2007, 2009, 2010, 2011, and 2012
 Develop Industry Excellence Award for Best Engine for 2009, 2010, 2011, 2013, 2016, 2017, and 2018
 Guinness World Record for most successful video game engine

Legal aspects

The state of the Unreal Engine came up in Epic's 2020 legal action against Apple Inc. claiming anticompetitive behavior in Apple's iOS App Store. Epic had uploaded a version of Fortnite that violated Apple's App Store allowances. Apple, in response, removed the Fortnite'' app and later threatened to terminate Epic's developer accounts which would have prevented Epic from updating the Unreal Engine for iOS and macOS. The court agreed to grant Epic a permanent injunction against Apple to prevent Apple from taking this step, since the court agreed that would impact numerous third-party developers that rely on the Unreal Engine.

See also
 Procedural generation
 Make Something Unreal
 Epic Citadel
 The Matrix Awakens
 On-set virtual production

References

Further reading

External links

 
1998 software
3D graphics software
Articles containing video clips
Epic Games
Game engines for Linux
Game engines that support Mantle (API)
Game engines that support Vulkan (API)
IPhone video game engines
Unreal S
Unreal (video game series)
Video game engines
Video game IDE
Virtual reality